Gornyak is a town and the administrative center of Loktevsky District of Altai Krai, Russia, located  southwest of Barnaul, the administrative center of the krai. Population:  It was previously known as Zolotukha (until 1942). It lies adjacent to the Kazakhstan–Russia border.

History
It was founded in 1751 as the selo of Zolotukha. In 1942, a miners' settlement was established in place of the old Zolotukha, named Gornyak. It was granted urban-type settlement status in 1946 and town status in 1969.

Administrative and municipal status
Within the framework of administrative divisions, Gornyak serves as the administrative center of Loktevsky District. As an administrative division, it is incorporated within Loktevsky District as the town of district significance of Gornyak. As a municipal division, the town of district significance of Gornyak is incorporated within Loktevsky Municipal District as Gornyak Urban Settlement.

References

Notes

Sources

External links
Official website of Gornyak 
Gornyak Business Directory  

Cities and towns in Altai Krai
Cities and towns built in the Soviet Union
Populated places established in 1751
1751 establishments in the Russian Empire